This is a record of all seasons played by Kremin Kremenchuk since their foundation in 1959.

1st team - Dnipro Kremenchuk - 1959-197?
2nd team - Kremin Kremenchuk - 198?-2001
3rd team - Kremin Kremenchuk - 2003–present

Seasons

Key

Key to league record:
P – games played
W – games won
D – games drawn
L – games lost
F – goals for
A – goals against
Pts – points
Pos – final position

Key to rounds:
PR1 – 1st Preliminary Round
PR2 – 2nd Preliminary Round
QF - Quarter-finals
W - Winners

Key to divisions:
SU Cup - Soviet Cup
S3rd - Soviet Second League
Z - Zone in the Soviet Second League
WB - Western Buffer Zone in the Soviet Second League
UZ - Ukrainian Zone in the Soviet Second League
B - Class B in Soviet Championship

A2 SG2 - Class B, Second Subgroup in Soviet Championship
UF - Ukrainian Soviet competitions
U KFK - Ukrainian championship among collectives of physical culture
1st - Ukrainian Premier League
2nd - Ukrainian First League
3rd - Ukrainian Second League
PO - Poltava Oblast Cup

Bold text indicates a competition won.
Top scorer shown in bold when he was also top scorer for the division.
Division shown in bold when it changes due to promotion, relegation or reorganization.
Where fields are left blank, the club did not participate in a competition that season.

References

 Kremin 2003-04 Season
 Kremin 2004-05 Season
 Kremin 2005-06 Season

 Kremin 2006-07 Season
 Kremin 2007-08 Season
 Kremin 2008-09 Season

Seasons
 
Kremin Kremenchuk